Joseph James Porter (born 5 May 1980) is an English cricketer.  Porter is a left-handed batsman who bowls slow left-arm orthodox.  He was born at Hammersmith, London.

Porter made his first-class debut for Oxford University against Somerset in 2000.  From 2000 to 2002, he represented the University in 9 first-class matches, the last of which came against Northamptonshire.  His final first-class match came for a British Universities team against the touring Sri Lankans.  In his 12 career first-class matches, he scored 522 runs at a batting average of 26.10, with 4 half centuries and a high score of 96.  In the field, he took 7 catches, while with the ball he took 6 wickets at a bowling average of 34.33, with best figures of 3/50.

In 2001, he represented Surrey in a single List A match against Northamptonshire.  The following season he represented the Surrey Cricket Board in a single List A match against the Gloucestershire Cricket Board in the 1st round of the 2003 Cheltenham & Gloucester Trophy which was played in 2002.  In his only match for the Board, he scored his career high List A score, by making 96 runs.  In his 2 matches, he scored a total of 119 runs at an average of 59.50, while in the field he took a single catch.  With the ball, he took 4 wickets at an average of 12.75, with best figures of 4/51.

In 2005, Porter joined Oxfordshire.  His debut for the county came in the Minor Counties Championship against Wiltshire.  During the 2005 season, he represented the county in 5 Championship matches, the last of which came against Dorset.  He also represented the county in a single MCCA Knockout Trophy match against Hertfordshire.

References

External links
Joe Porter at Cricinfo
Joe Porter at CricketArchive

1980 births
Living people
People from Hammersmith
Cricketers from Greater London
English cricketers
Oxford MCCU cricketers
Surrey cricketers
Surrey Cricket Board cricketers
Oxfordshire cricketers
Alumni of the University of Oxford
British Universities cricketers
Oxford Universities cricketers